Bring Me Love may refer to:
"Bring Me Love", a 1955 song by Brook Benton
"Bring Me Love", a 1956 song by The Clovers
"Bring Me Love", a 2006 song by Copyright featuring Imaani
"Bring Me Love", a 2007 song by Marié Digby
"Bring Me Love", a 2014 song by Tina Arena from her Reset album
"Bring Me Love", a 2018 song by John Legend from his A Legendary Christmas album
"Bring Me Love", a remix by Frankie Knuckles of the Andrea Mendez song